Président is a French dairy brand owned by Lactalis of Laval, Mayenne.  The brand was created in 1933 by André Besnier.   It is used for butter and for a range of industrially produced versions of traditional cheese.

History 
The brand was created in 1933 by André Besnier who by then was already a leading figure in the French dairy business.   Explaining the name's French context, Besnier explained that "France is the land of presidents, everyone is a president: of a club of fishermen, of bowlers, of veterans". « La France est le pays des Présidents, tout le monde est président! De l'association de pêche, des boulistes, des anciens combattants. »   (Presidential government had also enjoyed a higher profile in France since the return to power as president, in 1958, of leading president Charles de Gaulle.)

Landmark dates 
 1968: Launch of Président Camembert.
 1972: Launch of Président Coulommiers.
 1972: Launch of Président Butter.
 1975: Launch of Président Brie.
 1991: Launch of Président Emmental range.
 1993: Président sells its billionth Camembert.
 1995: Launch of Président brand in Germany and United States
 1999: Launch of Président Camembert and Emmental based cheese spread.
 2003: Launch of Président Mozzarella and Goats' cheese.
 2006: Launch of Président Cantal

References

External links 
 Président cheese English site
 Président - Site officiel 
 Le lactopole 
 La ferme Président 

Brand name dairy products
Cow's-milk cheeses
French cheeses
French brands
Lactalis